Portrait of a Man in a Top Hat is a drawing created in 1882 by Vincent van Gogh currently in Worcester Art Museum. It is one of Van Gogh's drawings depicting Adrianus Jacobus Zuyderland.

See also
Early works of Vincent van Gogh
Adrianus Jacobus Zuyderland (Van Gogh series)

References

Works by Vincent van Gogh
19th-century drawings
Collections of the Worcester Art Museum